Hall of Records may refer to:
 Hall of Records, a mythical library buried under the Great Sphinx of Giza
 Kennedy Mitchell Hall of Records, a government building in New Haven, Connecticut
 Kern County Hall of Records, a government building in Bakersfield, California
 Los Angeles County Hall of Records, a rare high-rise by Richard Neutra in downtown Los Angeles, California
 A vault behind Mount Rushmore National Memorial, South Dakota
 Surrogate's Courthouse,  a Beaux Arts municipal building in lower Manhattan in New York City